Konileti "Konrad" Hurrell (born 5 August 1991) is a Tongan professional rugby league footballer who plays as a  for St Helens in the Super League and Tonga at international level.

He previously played for the New Zealand Warriors and the Gold Coast Titans in the NRL and played for World All Stars side in 2016.

Early years
Hurrell was born in Tofoa, Tonga, and moved to New Zealand in late 2009 on a rugby union scholarship with Auckland Grammar School. 

He played for their first XV, earning vice captain in his second year, and represented Auckland Secondary Schools as a centre and second five-eighth. Hurrell was also a member of the athletics team and was New Zealand's national champion in weightlifting for the open weight category in 2010. Hurrell switched to rugby league in 2011. In 2011 he played for the Junior Warriors in the Toyota Cup. In this, his first year of playing rugby league, he scored 22 tries in 21 games and was named in the competition's Team of the Year. At the end of 2011 Hurrell was selected for the Junior Kiwis but was ineligible due to not having New Zealand Residency.

Playing career

2012
In 2012, Hurrell was promoted into the Warriors first grade squad by new coach Brian McClennan and played in all three trial matches. In February he signed a contract extension until the end of the 2013 season. Hurrell made his NRL debut for the Warriors in Round 1 against the Manly-Warringah Sea Eagles, impressing off the bench in the Warriors 26–20 loss at Eden Park. In round 2, Hurrell scored his first NRL career try in the 36–20 victory over the Parramatta Eels at Parramatta Stadium. In Round 18 in the 32–14 victory over the Gold Coast Titans at Cbus Super Stadium, Hurrell scored his first hat-trick in the NRL, which made it twelve tries from twelve games at that stage of the season. On 15 July, he re-signed with the Warriors until the end of 2015. On the day before the Warriors Round 24 game, Hurrell was dropped from the first grade team to the Auckland Vulcans NSW Cup team, following a poor defensive display in the Warriors embarrassing 12–52 loss against the North Queensland Cowboys at 1300SMILES Stadium. Hurrell, along with Shaun Johnson and Manu Vatuvei, finished the Warriors season as joint top try-scorer with 12 tries from 17 matches.

2013

Hurrell finished the Warriors season with 20 matches and 13 tries. In 2012, the Tonga-born Hurrell had signed a letter of intent with the New Zealand Rugby League, stating that he wanted to represent the New Zealand national rugby league team after qualifying on a residency basis. Despite this, he was named in the Tongan World Cup squad, playing in 3 matches and scoring a try against the Cook Islands in Tonga's 22–16 win.

2014
In February, Hurrell played in the Warriors inaugural 2014 Auckland Nines. He was overlooked for Round 1 and 2 matches, instead playing in the NSW Cup, before returning for the Round 3 match against the North Queensland Cowboys, scoring a try off the interchange bench. On 8 May 2014, Hurrell was fined $5,000 over a social media sex tape involving Shortland Street actress Teuila Blakely. Hurrell was later allowed to play the Round 9 match against the Canberra Raiders at Eden Park, scoring a try in the Warriors 54–12 win. Hurrell finished off the Warriors 2014 NRL season with him playing in 19 matches and scoring 12 tries. On 9 September, Hurrell was selected for the New Zealand national rugby league team Four Nations train-on squad, but didn't make the final 24-man squad.

2015
On 18 March, Hurrell re-signed with the Warriors to the end of the 2018 season. In Round 9 against the Cronulla-Sutherland Sharks, Hurrell was placed on report after he kneed Sharks forward Anthony Tupou in the face while taking a hit-up, leaving Tupou with a quadruple fracture of his jaw in the Warriors 20–16 win at Remondis Stadium. Tupou later had surgery that required four metal plates, screws and wiring. Hurrell was charged with a grade three dangerous contact, taking an early plea and was suspended for 3 matches. Hurrell later returned in Round 14 against the Sydney Roosters in the Warriors 25–21 loss at Mt Smart Stadium. Hurrell finished the 2015 NRL season with him playing in 12 matches and scoring 4 tries for the Warriors.

2016
On 29 January, Hurrell was named in the Warriors 2016 Auckland Nines squad. On 13 February, he played for the World All Stars against the Indigenous All Stars in the 2016 All Stars match, playing off the interchange bench and scoring a try in the World All Stars' 12–8 win at Suncorp Stadium. 

On 25 May, the Warriors announced that they had released him from the remainder of his contract effective immediately. The next day, he signed a contract with the Gold Coast Titans for the rest of the season and 2017.

2017
After making a significant impact to the Titans on his arrival mid 2016, Hurrell signed a contract extension until the end of 2019. Hurrell finished the regular season at the Titans winning The Members Most Valuable Player (MVP) as well as the Preston Award for his ongoing work within the community. 

Hurrell then competed in the 2017 World Cup representing his home country, Tonga.

2018

Hurrell begins the season with scoring the game winning try against the Canberra Raiders at Cbus Stadium on the Gold Coast. Hurrell plays his 100th NRL game in a loss against the St George Dragons in Toowoomba, QLD. Hurrell was selected to play for Tonga in the Pacific Test in July versing Samoa, resulting in a win and try for the centre. After a dip in form in the beginning of 2018, Hurrell played several games for the Tweed Heads Seagulls where he regained form and played out the rest of the season with the Gold Coast Titans.  

On the 12th of October, it was announced that Hurrell requested a release from the final year in his contract with the Titans, to sign as a Marquee Player for the Leeds Rhinos in the English Super League for the next 3 years.

2019
He had a stellar first year in the English Super League, becoming a crowd favourite and scoring a total of 14 tries in the season which made him the second highest try scorer for the year at the club. In April, while versing Hull Kingston Rovers, Hurrell scored 4 tries which surpassed his personal record of 3 tries in a single game.  

Hurrell won the Fans Player of the Year Award at the Presentation Night for the Leeds Rhinos on Monday, 9th of October.

2020
On 17 October 2020, he played in the 2020 Challenge Cup Final victory for Leeds over Salford at Wembley Stadium.

2021
Hurrell played a total of 17 games for Leeds in the 2021 Super League season including the club's 36–8 loss against St Helens in the semi-final. Following the conclusion of Super League XXVI, St Helens announced the signing of Hurrell on a one-year deal

2022
In round 1 of the 2022 Super League season, Hurrell made his club debut for St Helens R.F.C. where they defeated Catalans Dragons 28-8.  In June, Hurrell signed a one-year contract extension to remain at St Helens until the end of 2023.  In round 16, Hurrell scored two tries in a 42-12 victory over his former club Leeds.
In round 23, Hurrell scored two tries in a 60-6 victory over Hull F.C.
In the Grand Final against Leeds on 24 September 2022 ,Hurrell scored a try in the 24 -12 win which saw Saints win their fourth Grand Final win in a row.

2023
On 18 February, Hurrell played in St Helens 13-12 upset victory over Penrith in the 2023 World Club Challenge.
In round 3 of the 2023 Super League season, Hurrell was sent off in the final seconds of the match against Leeds after a tackle on Richie Myler. Leeds would then kick a drop goal right on the full-time siren to win 25-24.

References

External links

Leeds Rhinos profile
Gold Coast Titans profile
Titans profile
NRL profile
2017 RLWC profile
SL profile

1991 births
Living people
Gold Coast Titans players
Leeds Rhinos players
New Zealand Warriors players
New Zealand expatriate sportspeople in England
New Zealand expatriate sportspeople in Australia
NRL All Stars players
People educated at Auckland Grammar School
People from Tongatapu
Rugby league centres
St Helens R.F.C. players
Tonga national rugby league team players
Tongan emigrants to New Zealand
Tongan rugby league players
Tongan rugby union players
Tongan sportspeople